The Bungalow on the Beach is a 17th-century Danish colonial house which has belonged to the Governor of Danish India, who was styled Opperhoved, and after their exit in 1845, to the British administrator of the colony. Built in the 18th century, opposite the Fort Dansborg, by the Danish East India Company in what was once a pepper trading post of Tranquebar, now known as Tharangambadi, in Tamil Nadu, India. Tranquebar is a Danish term and came from the native Tamil word Tarangambadi, meaning 'place of the singing waves'.

The bungalow was acquired by Neemrana Hotels in 2000, and after restoration was opened in 2004, the company also runs two more heritage hotels in the town, Gate House and Nayak House.

History

Founded in 1616, following a privilege of Danish King Christian IV, the Danish East India Company, set up its base in Tranquebar, in the fort Dansborg, which was the seat of its Governor of Danish India, styled Opperhoved. Here Ove Gjedde, a Danish admiral arrived in 1620. He was given territory by the Nayak ruler of Tanjore. The Danish then settled there so as to export pepper to Denmark. They remained there until 1845, when after suffering heavy losses, the colony of Tranquebar was sold to British Raj, thereafter the house became the residence of the British administrator of the colony. The bungalow was then sold to Vellia Nadar [5] ; who was a prominent distillery owner whose descendants lived in it for over 125 years. Rao Bahadur Vellia Nadar was the uncle of Rao Bahadur T. Rattinasami Nadar of Porayar (a nearby town) T. Rattinasami Nadar was famous for forming the Nadar Mahajana Sangam and the Tamil Nadu Mercantile Bank (formerly called The Nadar Bank). After the Nadar family partition, the bungalow was finally passed down to B.Thavasumuthu Nadar and T.Rajeswari Ammal who along with their nine children T.Balagurusamy Nadar,T.Ponnusamy Nadar,T.Rajapather Nadar,N.Padmini,P.Dhanalakshmi,T.Rethinasamy Nadar,T.Narayanasamy Nadar,A.Gowri and K.Sundari lived a good many years in the bungalow. They were the last and final family to have resided in the bungalow. After the demise of T.Thavasumuthu Nadar, the children moved out and T.Rajeswari Ammal who found it difficult to maintain the colossal bungalow all by herself sold it to the Taj group of hotels in the1990's. The house was referred to as "Nadar Veedu" and was sold during the 1990s to the Taj group.

In 2000, the Bungalow  was bought by heritage hotel company, Neemrana Hotels, which after a two years of extensive restoration, the hotel opened on Christmas Eve in 2004, though the next day, Indian Ocean tsunami seriously damaged it, and another three months of restoration was required thereafter.

References

External links
 Bungalow on the Beach website

Hotels in Tamil Nadu
Danish India
Buildings and structures in Nagapattinam district
Buildings and structures in Danish India
Official residences in India
Heritage hotels in India